The Rolling Stones had six concert tours in 1964.

Tours band
Mick Jagger – lead vocals, harmonica
Keith Richards – guitar, backing vocals
Brian Jones – guitar, harmonica, backing vocals
Bill Wyman – bass guitar, backing vocals
Charlie Watts – drums, percussion

1st British tour

The Rolling Stones' first British tour was a concert tour. The tour commenced on 6 January and concluded on 27 January 1964.

1st British tour dates

2nd British tour

The Rolling Stones' 2nd British tour was a concert tour. The tour commenced on 8 February and concluded on 7 March 1964.

2nd British tour dates

1st American tour

The Rolling Stones' 1st American tour was the band's first concert tour of America. The tour commenced on 5 June and concluded on 20 June 1964. On this tour, the band supported their first U.S. album The Rolling Stones.

1st American tour dates

On 31 July 1964 the Rolling Stones played their first ever two dates in Ireland ... the first in Dublin, and the second, on their way home via Belfast International Airport, in Ballymena (the Flamingo Ballroom) where they played for S.D.Barr with the Cossacks Showband. They appeared that evening at 12.30 a.m. to a packed house.  It was a warm up for their 3rd British tour and a taster for their first Irish tour the next year.

3rd British tour

The Rolling Stones' 3rd British tour was a concert tour by the band. The tour commenced on 1 August and concluded on 22 August 1964. It included a single concert in the Netherlands and concluded with concerts in the Channel Islands.

3rd British tour dates

4th British tour

The Rolling Stones' 4th British tour was a concert tour by the band. The tour commenced on 5 September and concluded on 11 October 1964.

4th British tour dates

2nd American tour

The Rolling Stones' 2nd American tour was a concert tour by the band. The tour commenced on 24 October 1964 and concluded on 15 November 1964. On this tour, the band supported their album 12 X 5.

2nd American tour dates

References

 

The Rolling Stones concert tours
1964 concert tours